Gordon Norton (November 2, 1924 – June 18, 2018) was a Canadian yacht racer and Commodore of the Royal Canadian Yacht Club in 1975–1976. He competed in the 1960 Summer Olympics as part of the Argo II crew who finished fifth in the Dragon class under skipper Sandy MacDonald and with crew member Lynn Watters.

References

1924 births
2018 deaths
Sportspeople from Toronto
Canadian male sailors (sport)
Olympic sailors of Canada
Sailors at the 1960 Summer Olympics – Dragon
University of Toronto alumni